The Arunachal rain snake or black and yellow smithophis (Smithophis arunachalensis) is a species of snake found in India.

References

Smithophis
Reptiles described in 2020
Reptiles of India